Andrea María Nocetti Gómez (born 18 March 1978) is a Colombian model, actress, and former Miss Colombia 2000.

Nocetti started her career as a model. She became Miss Colombia, representing Cartagena, in November 2000.  Her first television appearance was in 2004, appearing in the Caracol TV reality show La Granja Tolima, and on the 2005 telenovela El pasado no perdona. In 2007, she played the evil Fernanda Sanmiguel de Ferreira on the Caracol TV telenovela Nuevo Rico Nuevo Pobre. In 2009, she appeared in Bermúdez, also as the evil Lucía Congote.

Nocetti starred in the 2008 Colombian film Ni te cases ni te embarques, opposite Víctor Hugo Cabrera.

Controversy with David Letterman
In May 2001, David Letterman joked about the 'special talent' which Noceti, the then-reigning Miss Colombia, possessed - that she was able to "swallow 50 balloons full of heroin" for the (non-existent) talent competition in the Miss Universe 2001 pageant. The remark not only infuriated the beauty queen, but also the people of Colombia.

Nocetti threatened to sue Letterman but later withdrew the threat after Letterman formally apologized to her in the Late Show with David Letterman. Letterman invited the beauty queen to appear on his show as a gesture of appeasement.

References

External links
  Colarte
  Caracol TV
 

1978 births
Colombian beauty pageant winners
Colombian telenovela actresses
Colombian television actresses
Living people
Miss Colombia winners
Miss Universe 2001 contestants
People from Cartagena, Colombia